Spalding is a town located north of the Clare Valley in South Australia, Australia.

It is mainly a farming community and also is home to a slate quarry.
 
Services in the town include a supermarket, hotel, school, gun supplies store, roadhouse, Country Fire Service station, South Australian State Emergency Service (SES) unit, dedicated post office and police station.

Spalding is presumed to be named after the market town of Spalding, Lincolnshire in the UK.

History
Prior to 1869, there were five sheep runs in the Spalding area: Bundaleer, Booborowie, Canowie, Hill River and Bungaree. From this date, the Spalding area was made available to farmers and a farming-centred community grew.

On 30 July 1885, the District Council of Spalding was proclaimed; it remained until 1997, when it merged into the Northern Areas Council. In 1925 a post office was built in Spalding.

Spalding was serviced by a broad gauge railway line through the Clare Valley from Adelaide from its construction in 1922 until the last train in 1978.

The historic Spalding Railway Bridge over the Broughton River and Bundaleer Reservoir site are both listed on the South Australian Heritage Register.

Features of interest
The Heysen Trail runs past Spalding, which is approximately the midpoint of the 1200 km walking route.

References

Towns in South Australia
Mid North (South Australia)